Romain Frou (born 3 January 1984 in Nantes, France) is a French rugby union player. He plays at prop for Stade Français in the Top 14.

References

External links
Ligue Nationale De Rugby Profile
European Professional Club Rugby Profile
Stade Français Profile

Living people
1984 births
French rugby union players
Rugby union props